The National Film Award for Best Supporting Actor, officially known as the Rajat Kamal Award for the Best Supporting Actor, is an honour presented annually at India's National Film Awards ceremony by the Directorate of Film Festivals (DFF), an organisation set up by the Indian Ministry of Information and Broadcasting. A national panel appointed annually by the DFF selects the actor who has given the best performance in a supporting role within Indian cinema. The award is presented by the President of India at a ceremony held in New Delhi.

Including ties and repeat winners, the government of India has presented a total of 32 Best Supporting Actor awards to 29 different actors. Although Indian cinema produces films in more than 20 languages, the actors whose performances have won awards have worked in one or more of seven major languages: Hindi (17 awards), Tamil (9 awards), Bengali (3 awards), Malayalam (4 awards), Marathi (3 awards), Telugu (1 award), Kannada (1 award).

The first recipient was Victor Banerjee, who was honoured at the 32nd National Film Awards for his performance in the Bengali film Ghare Baire (1984). As of the 2013 awards, three actors—Nana Patekar, Pankaj Kapur, and Atul Kulkarni—have been honoured twice. Patekar was awarded for the Hindi films Parinda (1989) and Agni Sakshi (1996). Kapur received the awards for his work in the Hindi films Raakh (1988) and Maqbool (2003). Kulkarni was awarded for his performances in the Tamil / Hindi film Hey Ram (1999) and the Hindi film Chandni Bar (2001). Paresh Rawal and Dilip Prabhavalkar have each won the award for two performances in a single year. Rawal received the award for his starring roles in the Hindi films Woh Chokri (1993) and Sir (1993) at the 41st National Film Awards, while Prabhavalkar won at the 54th National Film Awards for his performances in the Hindi film Lage Raho Munna Bhai (2006) and the Marathi film Shevri (2006). At the 42nd National Film Awards, the award was tied between Ashish Vidyarthi and Nagesh, winning for their roles in the Hindi film Drohkaal (1994) and the Tamil film Nammavar (1994), respectively. The most recent recipient of the award is Biju Menon, who was honoured at the 67th National Film Awards ceremony for his performance in the Malayalam film Ayyappanum Koshiyum (2020).

List of recipients

Key

See also
 List of Indian film actors

Footnotes

References

External links
 Official Page for Directorate of Film Festivals, India
 National Film Awards Archives

Supporting Actor
Film awards for supporting actor